Noekk is a German progressive doom metal band that is a collaboration of two then former Empyrium members (Markus Stock,   Ulf T. Schwadorf, and Thomas Helm). The origin of the band's name is supposed to come from a water creature that was able to transform into a beautiful white horse. When the proud stallion eventually got a human to mount it, it dashed into the dark waters and drowned the victim. According to the band, the Noekk demanded an annual human sacrifice, but this is not a part of the traditional folklore. Noekk has released four full-length albums on Prophecy Productions, and their most recent album, The White Lady was released independently in 2021.

Line-up
F.F. Yugoth ( Markus Stock) - drums, bass, guitar
Funghus Baldachin (a.k.a. Thomas Helm) - vocals, keyboard, guitar

Discography

All albums listed below are full-length albums, except where noted.

The Water Sprite (2005)
The Grimalkin (2006)
The Minstrel's Curse (2008)
Carol Stones and Elder Rock (EP, 2018)
Waltzing in Obscurity (2019)
The White Lady (2021)

References

External links
 

German heavy metal musical groups
Musical groups established in 2004
German doom metal musical groups